Gorjuše is a high-elevation settlement on the Pokljuka Plateau in the Municipality of Bohinj in the Upper Carniola region of Slovenia. It is made up of the three disconnected hamlets of Spodnje Gorjuše, Srednje Gorjuše, and Zgornje Gorjuše (literally, 'lower, middle, and upper Gorjuše').

References

External links

Gorjuše at Geopedia

Populated places in the Municipality of Bohinj